Fabianus Tibo was an Indonesian Catholic citizen who was executed by firing squad on 22 September 2006 at 1:20 a.m. local time together with Dominggus da Silva and Marinus Riwu for leading riots in Poso, Sulawesi in 2000 that led to the murders of about 200 people.

Human rights activists have expressed doubts that Tibo, and the other men, were the masterminds of the riots. The different treatment of Christians and Muslims in court was also criticised, as few Muslims were ever punished for their roles in the riots and none were sentenced to more than 15 years' jail. Religious leaders of Christianity and Islam, including Pope Benedict XVI and Abdurrahman Wahid, former President of Indonesia and former leader of Nahdlatul Ulama, protested the execution of Tibo.

See also
 Capital punishment in Indonesia

References

People executed by Indonesia by firing squad
People executed for murder
Roman Catholic activists
1945 births
2006 deaths
Indonesian Roman Catholics
21st-century executions by Indonesia
Executed Indonesian people
21st-century Roman Catholic martyrs

Executed mass murderers
Mass murder in Indonesia